The Essential Book of K9 is a science fiction anthology book by Paul M. Tams and Bob Baker based on the television series Doctor Who and focuses on the character K9. The book was released in 2015 and published by Meteoric Books.

Contents
The book contains interviews and articles about K9's history and includes a comic strip and short fiction.

Fiction

Development
The book was originally announced in December, 2011 as The Complete Book of K9 and was planned to be released the following year with pre-orders beginning in February. The book would've covered the history of K9, interviews with people involved with the character, and never-before-seen photos, designs a behind-the-scenes details. Another book, The K9 Story Book, was planned for release in 2012, originally set for release in September, 2011, to tie in with the repeat of the first series of the K-9 television series on Channel 5.

The book was re-announced in January, 2015, as The Essential Book of K9 and a crowd-funding project on Indiegogo began to raise funds for it which lasted for two months. The project had raised £2,968, 59% of its goal of £5,000.

Marketing
To promote the book, a signing with Bob Baker was held at The Who Shop, London, on September 5, 2015, and at The Comic Guru in Cardiff on October 10, 2015.

References

External links
 

2015 anthologies
Books based on Doctor Who
Crowdfunded books
Indiegogo projects
Science fiction anthologies
Works by Bob Baker (scriptwriter)